The Leader of the Ulster Unionist Party is the most senior position within the party ranks. Since 2021 the leader has been Doug Beattie MLA.

List

See also
 Ulster Unionist Party
 Prime Minister of Northern Ireland
 Ulster Unionist Party Presidents and General Secretaries

References

 
Ulster Unionist Party